The Brantford Lions were a Canadian junior ice hockey team in the Ontario Hockey Association, based in Brantford, Ontario. The Lions played at the Junior A level from 1933 to 1936, and again from 1941 to 1944. In the intermediate years, the played at the Junior B level, from 1936 to 1941, and again from 1944 to 1946. They were Junior B Ontario champions in the 1940–41 season.

Hockey Hall of Fame defenceman Bill Quackenbush played for the Lions in 1941–42. That season, Bob Wiest led the league in scoring, winning the Eddie Powers Memorial Trophy with 40 goals and 28 assists in 40 games. The same year, Branford finished first place in the OHA for the regular season, but lost in the first round of the playoffs to the defending champions, the Oshawa Generals. The Lions were runners-up to the J. Ross Robertson Cup in 1943, but against lost to the Oshawa Generals.

NHL alumni
Junior A alumni

Junior B alumni

Yearly results

References

Sport in Brantford
Defunct Ontario Hockey League teams
1933 establishments in Ontario
1946 disestablishments in Ontario